California's 16th district may refer to:

 California's 16th congressional district
 California's 16th State Assembly district
 California's 16th State Senate district